"Jurassic Park Coalition" is a song written by Arash Sobhani and performed by Iranian rock band Kiosk, Arash Sobhani made it in protest of Mahmoud Ahmadinejad's to New York 2009 visit to the United Nations in support of the Green Movement. Sobhani presented the song to members of the Guardian Council, in which he ridiculed the role of the Guardian Council in the Islamic Republic of Iran. Kiosk also performed the song in March 2010 at the London Institute of Contemporary Art onstage, which was welcomed by audiences.

References 

2010 singles
Iranian songs
Alternative rock songs
2010 songs